The 2015 East Riding of Yorkshire Council election took place on 7 May 2015 to elect members of East Riding of Yorkshire Council in England. This was on the same day as other local elections across the country. All 67 seats were contested. The Conservatives retained control of the council, surpassing the 34-seat majority threshold with 51 seats, down 2 from the last election.

Election result

Ward results

Beverley Rural

Bridlington Central and Old Town

Bridlington North

Bridlington South

Cottingham North

Cottingham South

Dale

Driffield and Rural

East Wolds and Coastal

Goole North

Goole South

Hessle

Howden

Howdenshire

Mid Holderness

Minster and Woodmansey

North Holderness

Pocklington Provincial

Snaith, Airmyn, Rawcliffe and Marshland

South East Holderness

South Hunsley

South West Holderness

St Mary's

Tranby

Willerby and Kirk Ella

Wolds Weighton

References
General
For infobox election figures: 

Specific

2015 English local elections
2015
2010s in the East Riding of Yorkshire